Vagabonds of the Western World is the third studio album by Irish hard rock band Thin Lizzy, released in 1973. It was the band's last album with original guitarist Eric Bell and the first to feature the artwork of Jim Fitzpatrick, whose work would appear on many subsequent albums by the band.

Reception

Pitchfork reviewer Stuart Berman remarked how Thin Lizzy were "starting to kick out the jams with greater confidence and consistency" on this album, with Lynott producing "the sound of a spiritually adrift musician ecstatically discovering his true calling." Canadian journalist Martin Popoff remarked the album's "crusty sound quality and style-searching waywardness", mixing influences ranging from American blues, to Motown, to early metal. He rated Vagabonds of the Western World the lowest of all Thin Lizzy's albums for four tracks which "seem either simple and out-of-character or dated", "bearing scant few traces of the high class Lizzy imprint."Eduardo Rivadavia of AllMusic described the album as "brimming with attitude and dangerous swagger", and Thin Lizzy's "first sonically satisfying album", with "The Rocker" their "first bona fide classic". He described "Little Girl in Bloom" as "absolutely flawless", but criticised "The Hero and the Madman" and "Slow Blues" as "overblown" and "tepid" respectively.

Track listings

When the album was repackaged for CD in 1991, it included the respective A and B-sides of the two singles released at around the same time. "Whiskey in the Jar" was Lizzy's first hit.

Remastered and expanded release
On 11 October 2010 Vagabonds of the Western World was reissued as a 2CD deluxe edition. This version was remastered with bonus tracks. The original album and bonus material is featured on disc 1, while disc 2 features bonus material.

Singles
"Whisky in the Jar" / "Black Boys on the Corner" – 3 November 1972 (Irish Singles Chart No. 1, UK Singles Chart No. 6)
"Randolph's Tango" / "Broken Dreams" – 4 May 1973 (Irish Singles Chart No. 14)
"The Rocker" / "Here I Go Again" – 9 November 1973 (Irish Singles Chart No. 11)
In Germany, the B-side was "A Ride in the Lizzy Mobile".
"Little Darling" / "Buffalo Gal" – 11 April 1974
In the USA, the B-side was "The Rocker".

Personnel
Thin Lizzy
 Philip Lynott - vocals, bass guitar, rhythm guitar, associate producer
 Eric Bell – lead guitar
 Brian Downey – drums, percussion

Additional musicians
 Kid Jensen – voice on "The Hero and the Madman"
 Jan Schelhaas – organ on "Mama Nature Said" and "The Hero and the Madman"
 Fiachra Trench – string arrangement on "A Song for While I'm Away" and "Little Darling"
 Gary Moore - lead guitar and acoustic guitar on "Sitamoia" and "Little Darling"
 Strings: Tony Harris – viola; Ian MacKinnon – violin; Don McVay – viola; Alan Merrick – violin; Paul Mosby – cor anglais, oboe; Peter Oxar – violin; Peter Poole – violin; Godfrey Salmon – violin; Alan Sloan – violin; Quentin Williams – cello

Production
 Nick Tauber – producer
 Derek Varnals, Alan Harris, John Fuller – engineers
 Alan Leaming, Dave Baker, Pete Swetenham – assistant engineers
 Jim Fitzpatrick – artwork, design
 Rodney Matthews – design
 Mick Rock, John Thomson – photography

References

Thin Lizzy albums
1973 albums
Decca Records albums
London Records albums